Cohnia is a genus of Neotropical, sickle-bearing bush crickets in the tribe Odonturini, described by Buzzetti, Fontana & Carotti in 2010.

Species
The Orthoptera Species File lists:
Cohnia andeana Hebard, 1924 - type species (as Dichopetala andeana Hebard)
Cohnia equatorialis Giglio-Tos, 1898
Cohnia inca Rehn, 1955
Cohnia transfuga (Brunner von Wattenwyl, 1878)

References

Phaneropterinae
Tettigoniidae genera